The Caopo River is a tributary of the Min River in Wenchuan County, Sichuan Province, China. It is interrupted by the Shapai Dam.

References

Rivers of Sichuan